Geekbench is a popular cross-platform utility for benchmarking the central processing unit (CPU) and graphics processing unit (GPU) of computers, laptops, tablets, and phones.

History
Geekbench began as a benchmark for Mac OS X and Windows, and is now a cross-platform benchmark that supports macOS, Windows, Linux, Android and iOS.

In version 4, Geekbench started measuring GPU performance in areas such as image processing and computer vision.

In version 5, Geekbench dropped support for x86-32.

In version 6, the current version, Geekbench includes CPU and GPU Compute benchmarks.

Usage
It uses a scoring system that separates single-core and multi-core performance, and workloads that simulate real-world scenarios. The software benchmark is available for macOS, Windows, Linux, Android and iOS.

In 2013, the usefulness of the scores from earlier versions of Geekbench (up to version 3) was heavily disputed by Linus Torvalds in an online forum. Linus's concerns that Geekbench combined disparate benchmarks into a single score. were addressed in Geekbench 4 by splitting integer, floating point, and crypto into sub-scores. Linus regarded this changes as improvements in an informal review.

References

External links
 

Benchmarks (computing)